Bo Anders Niklas Strömstedt (born 25 July 1958) is a Swedish singer, songwriter, musician, record producer and actor.

Early life 

Niklas Strömstedt was born on 25 July 1958 in Lund as the first child of Margareta (née Henriksson) and Bo Strömstedt.

Strömstedt's sister, Lotten, is four years his junior. Strömstedt was raised in the Stockholm suburb of Hagsätra. Strömstedt attended Adolf Fredrik's Music School in Stockholm.

Career 

Strömstedt played the keyboards on Ulf Lundell's recordings and tours from the late 1970s to the end of the 1980s.

Strömstedt's most recognised hit as a solo artist is the song "Om", reaching number one on the Swedish chart and Svensktoppen in 1990. He also had success with the album Halvvägs till framtiden released in 1992 with the hits "Oslagbara" and "Bilderna av dej". In 1994 he formed the music group GES with Orup and Anders Glenmark.

Melodifestivalen 

Strömstedt wrote music and lyrics to "I morgon är en annan dag", with which Christer Björkman won Melodifestivalen 1992. In Melodifestivalen 2008 he participated himself as a wildcard in the fourth heat in Karlskrona. He finished last.

Personal life 

In 1985, Strömstedt married Efva Attling, a former model and jewellery designer. They had two children—Adam and Simon—born in 1987 and 1991, respectively.

He also has a child with Agneta Sjödin. Strömstedt married Jenny Strömstedt in Trosa on 16 July 2011.

Other work 

 He wrote the title song for the TV-series Nya tider on TV4 1999–2003.
 He wrote the Swedish lyrics for the musical Mamma Mia!.

Discography 

Solo
 Skjut inte... det är bara jag! (1981)
 Andra äventyr (1983)
 En gång i livet (1989)
 Om! (1990)
 Halvvägs till framtiden (1992)
 Långt liv i lycka (1997)
 Du blir du jag blir jag (2001)
 Två vägar (2008)

Triad
 Triad (1988)

Glenmark Eriksson Strömstedt
 Glenmark, Eriksson, Strömstedt (1995)
 Den andra skivan (2003)

Filmography

Film

Television

References

Sources

External links 

 
 
 
 
 

 
1958 births
Living people
20th-century Swedish guitarists
20th-century Swedish composers
20th-century Swedish singers
21st-century Swedish guitarists
21st-century Swedish composers
21st-century Swedish singers
Glenmark Eriksson Strömstedt members
Swedish male guitarists
Swedish male singers
Swedish male singer-songwriters
Swedish multi-instrumentalists
Swedish pop guitarists
Swedish pop rock singers
Swedish pop singers
Swedish rock guitarists
Swedish rock singers
Musicians from Lund
Singers from Lund
Melodifestivalen contestants of 2008